Moon is the ninth album by soprano saxophonist Steve Lacy and was recorded in Rome in 1969 and originally released on the BYG Actuel label featuring five compositions by Lacy performed by Lacy, Italo Toni, Claudo Volonte, Irene Aebi, Marcello Melis and Jacques Thollot.

Reception
The Allmusic review by Scott Yanow awarded the album 3 stars stating "Lacy had not yet fully developed his more relaxed, scalar approach to improvising, but his playing is certainly quite distinctive and generally pretty lyrical during performances of five Lacy originals.".

Track listing
 "Hit" - 4:58
 "Note" - 4:27
 "Moon" - 7:30
 "Laugh" - 3:47
 "The Breath" - 8:07

All compositions by Steve Lacy
Recorded in Rome, Italy on September, 1969

Personnel
Steve Lacy - soprano saxophone
Italo Toni - trombone
Claudio Volonte - clarinet
Irene Aebi - cello
Jacques Thollot - drums
Marcello Melis - bass

References 

 

1969 albums
Steve Lacy (saxophonist) albums
BYG Actuel albums